The Battle of Auray took place on 29 September 1364 at the Breton-French town of Auray. This battle was the decisive confrontation of the Breton War of Succession, a part of the Hundred Years' War.

In the battle, which began as a siege, a Breton army, led by Duke John de Montfort, assisted by English forces commanded by John Chandos, opposed a Breton army led by his rival Charles of Blois and assisted by French forces led by Bertrand du Guesclin.

Prelude
At the beginning of 1364, after the failure of the negotiations of Évran, Montfort, with the assistance of John Chandos, came to attack Auray, which had been in the hands of Franco-Bretons since 1342. He entered the town of Auray and besieged the castle, which was blockaded by sea by the ships of Nicolas Bouchart coming from Le Croisic.

Without food supplies, the besieged agreed to surrender the place, if help did not arrive before Michaelmas (29 September). Two days before, Charles of Blois had arrived east of the abbey of Lanvaux. Bertrand du Guesclin, who commanded the vanguard of the French troops, was in nearby Brandivy.

On 28 September, du Guesclin landed on the left bank of the river, and took up position before the castle. To avoid being caught between the castle and the French Army, Montfort evacuated Auray and took up a position facing the enemy, on the slope of the right bank of the river.

On the 29 September, attempts at agreement having failed, Charles of Blois prepared for the attack. His army crossed the river and lined up facing south, considered a bad position by some of his commanders because it was on a marshy plain north of the town and castle. Montfort followed the movement and lined up facing north, in a more dominating position. Rejecting the advice of du Guesclin, Charles of Blois then ordered the attack against Montfort's forces.

Involved forces

Franco-Breton army of Charles of Blois 

On the left the Count of Auxerre, on the right Du Guesclin, in the center Charles of Blois. A reserve was not used.  Each division had roughly 1,000 men.

Anglo-Breton army of John of Montfort 

On the right Olivier de Clisson, on the left Robert Knolles, in the centre John de Montfort and John Chandos. A significant reserve, under Hugh Calveley, was also on hand ready to intervene.

Battle 

The battle began with a short skirmish between the French arbalesters and the English archers. The men-at-arms then engaged directly without seeking to maneuver. It was a bloody combat because all wanted the battle to be decisive to put an end to the long and cruel war. Moreover, orders were given on both sides not to give quarter to captives.

Each Anglo-Breton corps was attacked head on, one after the other, but the reserves restored the situation. The right wing of the Franco-Breton position was then counterattacked and driven back and since it was not being supported by its own reserves, it was folded up towards the centre. The left wing then folded in turn, the Count of Auxerre was captured, and the troops of Charles of Blois broke and fled. Charles, having been struck down by a lance, was finished off by an English soldier, obeying orders to show no quarter. Du Guesclin, having broken all his weapons, was obliged to surrender to the English commander Chandos. Du Guesclin was taken into custody and ransomed by Charles V for 100,000 francs.

Consequences 

This victory put an end to the war of succession. One year later, in 1365, under the first Treaty of Guérande,  the king of France recognized John IV, the son of John of Montfort as duke of Brittany. However,  John IV then paid homage to Charles V of France, rather than to his patron, Edward III of England. The Anglo-Breton military victory appeared to result in a diplomatic coup for the King of France.

Notes

References 

 The Ransom of Olivier de Guesclin, in Historical Research 129, May 1981.

1364 in England
1360s in France
Auray 1364
History of Morbihan
Auray
Auray
War of the Breton Succession